Three Rivers is a city in St. Joseph County, Michigan. The population was 7,973 at the time of the 2020 census.

Three Rivers derives its name from its location at the confluence of the St. Joseph River and two tributaries, the Rocky and Portage rivers. The St. Joseph River flows into Lake Michigan.

The city is the home of St. Gregory's Abbey, a Benedictine monastery of the Episcopal Church, which was established in 1946.

Geography

Highways

Climate

Demographics

As of 2000 the median income for a household in the city was $32,460, and the median income for a family was $36,272. Males had a median income of $31,849 versus $23,659 for females. The per capita income for the city was $16,279. About 16.2% of families and 19.3% of the population were below the poverty line, including 25.5% of those under age 18 and 9.4% of those age 65 or over.

2010 census
As of the census of 2010, there were 7,811 people. The 49093 Three Rivers zip code population as of 2010 stands at just shy of 20,000 people 3,048 households, and 1,862 families residing in the city. The racial makeup of the city was 82.6% White, 10.1% African American, 0.6% Native American, 0.9% Asian, 1.8% from other races, and 4.0% from two or more races. Hispanic or Latino of any race were 5.2% of the population.

There were 3,048 households, of which 36.9% had children under the age of 18 living with them, 35.2% were married couples living together, 19.7% had a female householder with no husband present, 6.2% had a male householder with no wife present, and 38.9% were non-families. 32.5% of all households were made up of individuals, and 12.5% had someone living alone who was 65 years of age or older. The average household size was 2.50 and the average family size was 3.15.

The median age in the city was 31.5 years. 28.5% of residents were under the age of 18; 10.6% were between the ages of 18 and 24; 27.3% were from 25 to 44; 21.5% were from 45 to 64; and 12% were 65 years of age or older. The gender makeup of the city was 47.7% male and 52.3% female.

Education
Public education for Three Rivers and the surrounding area is provided by the Three Rivers Community Schools.

Secondary schools
Three Rivers High School
Three Rivers Middle School
Barrows Adult Education

Elementary schools
Andrews
Norton
Park
Ruth Hoppin

Private schools include Immaculate Conception School and Heartwood Renaissance Academy.

Notable people

Neal Ball, first player in Major League Baseball history to pull off an unassisted triple play; played for Three Rivers's semi-pro team in 1901.
Harry Blackstone Jr., magician; was born in Three Rivers.
Daniel Booko, actor known for The Suite Life of Zack & Cody, Hannah Montana, and iCarly
Paul Christy, former professional wrestler
Charles Collingwood, CBS television news correspondent
David R. Leitch, former member of the Illinois General Assembly
Pete Metzelaars, former NFL player
Jack Perrin, silent film actor
Matt Thornton, retired professional baseball player

References

Cities in St. Joseph County, Michigan